The 2020–21 Ardal NE season (also known as the 2020–21 Lock Stock Ardal NE season for sponsorship reasons) was to be the first season of the new third-tier northern region football in Welsh football pyramid, part of the Ardal Leagues.  Teams were to play each other twice on a home and away basis.

Due to the COVID-19 pandemic in Wales, the Football Association of Wales cancelled the 2020–21 seasons of the Ardal Leagues and below.

Teams
Normally, the league is made up of 16 teams competing for one automatic promotion place to Cymru North, whilst the second place team goes into a play-off with the second place team of Ardal NW.  Three teams are relegated to Tier 4.

Team changes

To Ardal NE
From Mid Wales Football League Division 1
 Bow Street
 Caersws
 Welshpool Town
 Berriew
 Montgomery Town
 Kerry
 Carno
 Four Crosses

Promoted from Mid Wales Football League Division 2
 Penparcau
 Machynlleth

From Welsh National League Premier Division
 Cefn Albion
 Penycae
 Rhos Aelwyd
 Chirk AAA

Relegated from Cymru North
 Corwen
 Llanfair United

Stadia and locations

Source: Ardal NE Ground Information

Season overview
On 28 July 2020, the Football Association of Wales announced that this league would be named Ardal NE and would be sponsored by Lock Stock Self Storage.  Ardal NE & Ardal NW divisions will make up the Ardal Northern region of Tier 3 in the men's Welsh domestic game.

Since anti-COVID-19 restrictions were put in place by FAW, clubs could have trained in groups of 15 and contact training was allowed at all-levels of football.  However, competitive and exhibition matches were still not allowed to take place.

On 26 March 2021, Montgomery Town announced that they would be withdrawing from the Ardal League. The National Game Board will now be tasked with whether to fill the vacancy will be filled for the 2021/22 season, following the gap in the league.

League table

Results

References

External links
Football Association of Wales
Ardal Northern Leagues
Ardal Northern Twitter Page
Tier 3 Rules & Regulations

2020–21 in Welsh football
Ardal Leagues
Wales